John James Hanlon (12 October 1917 – 12 January 2002) was an English footballer who played as a forward. He was signed as a trainee for Manchester United in 1934 and became a professional one year later. In 1948, he was transferred to Bury. In 63 matches for Manchester United, he scored 20 goals.

External links
Profile at StretfordEnd.co.uk
Profile at MUFCInfo.com

1917 births
2002 deaths
People from Stretford
English footballers
Association football forwards
Manchester United F.C. players
Bury F.C. players
Footballers from Greater Manchester